Bigeminal pulse is a medical condition, easily confused with pulsus alternans. Similar features between bigeminal pulse and pulsus alternans are strong peak and weak peak. However, unlike pulsus alternans, the weak beat in bigeminal pulse occurs prematurely (early). Thus, not followed a pause as it is in pulsus alternans but occurs close to normal strong beat.

References

Cardiovascular diseases